The Middle Tennessee Blue Raiders football statistical leaders are individual statistical leaders of the Middle Tennessee Blue Raiders football program in various categories, including passing, rushing, receiving, total offense, defensive stats, and kicking. Within those areas, the lists identify single-game, single-season, and career leaders. The Blue Raiders represent Middle Tennessee State University in the NCAA's Conference USA.

Although Middle Tennessee began competing in intercollegiate football in 1911, the school's official record book considers the "modern era" to have begun in 1949. Records from before this year are often incomplete and inconsistent, and they are generally not included in these lists.

These lists are dominated by more recent players for several reasons:
 Since 1949, seasons have increased from 10 games to 11 and then 12 games in length.
 The NCAA didn't allow freshmen to play varsity football until 1972 (with the exception of the World War II years), allowing players to have four-year careers.
 Bowl games only began counting toward single-season and career statistics in 2002. The Blue Raiders have played in seven bowl games since then, and will play an eighth in 2018, giving many recent players an extra game to accumulate statistics.
 In addition, the Blue Raiders played in the 2018 C-USA Championship Game, providing yet another game for players in that season.

These lists are updated through the 2018 C-USA Championship Game.

Passing

Passing yards

Passing touchdowns

Rushing

Rushing yards

Rushing touchdowns

Receiving

Receptions

Receiving yards

Receiving touchdowns

Total offense
Total offense is the sum of passing and rushing statistics. It does not include receiving or returns.

Total offense yards

Total touchdowns

Defense

Interceptions

Tackles

Sacks

Kicking

Field goals made

Field goal percentage

References

Middle Tennessee